Logan Glacier is in Glacier National Park in the U.S. state of Montana. The glacier is situated in a cirque to the northeast of Mount Logan. Just east of the Continental Divide, Logan Glacier is northwest of Red Eagle Glacier. Comparing images of the glacier taken in 1914 with those from 2009, indicates that the glacier has experienced extensive retreat.

See also
 List of glaciers in the United States
 Glaciers in Glacier National Park (U.S.)

References

Glaciers of Glacier County, Montana
Glaciers of Glacier National Park (U.S.)
Glaciers of Montana